Holbrook Bridge may refer to:

Holbrook Bridge (State Route 77, Holbrook, Arizona), listed on the National Register of Historic Places in Navajo County, Arizona
Holbrook Bridge (U.S. Route 70, Holbrook, Arizona), listed on the National Register of Historic Places in Navajo County, Arizona

See also
Holbrook House (disambiguation)